St. Peter's Academy is an Anglican secondary school in Stoke-on-Trent, England. It is an academy sponsored by the Woodard Academies and the Diocese of Lichfield. It is the merger of two former schools: Berryhill High School and Sports College and St Peter's High School.

Construction
The school was built by Thomas Vale Construction costing £18.7 million; it was built as part of the Stoke-on-Trent City Councils BSF (Building Schools for the Future) Programme. Its construction started in 2011 and was completed in September 2013 as planned. It was built to "provide a world class education within a clear Christian ethos which purposefully serves the wide and diverse needs of the community of Stoke-on-Trent."

References

Secondary schools in Stoke-on-Trent
Church of England secondary schools in the Diocese of Lichfield
Academies in Stoke-on-Trent